The  Chrysler Valiant (VG) is an automobile which was produced in by Chrysler Australia from 1970 to 1971. It was the eighth Chrysler Valiant model to be produced in Australia.

Overview
The Valiant VG was a facelifted version of the Valiant VF with a restyled front grille and rectangular headlights. Sedans were also given new horizontal taillights. Rear end styling on the utility remained virtually the same for the third consecutive model series. From the A-pillar back, the two-door hardtop remained the same as the VF Valiant/U.S Dodge Dart.  

The VG range featured a newly introduced Australian built "Hemi" six cylinder engine which was claimed by Chrysler to be the most advanced engine of its kind in the world.

Model range
The Valiant (VG) was offered in 4-door sedan, 2-door hardtop,  5-door station wagon and 2-door coupe utility models.

 Valiant sedan (VG-M41) 
 Valiant hardtop (VG-M23) 
 Valiant Safari wagon (VG-M45)
 Valiant Pacer sedan (VG-S41) 
 Valiant Pacer hardtop (VG-S23)
 Valiant Regal sedan (VG-H41)
 Valiant Regal hardtop (VG-H23) 
 Valiant Regal Safari wagon (VG-H45) 
 Valiant Regal 770 sedan (VG-H41 shared with Regal)
 Valiant Regal 770 hardtop (VG-H23 shared with Regal)
 Valiant Wayfarer utility (VG-L20)

Coupe utilities again used the previous VE series rear end styling with updated front end.

Dodge utility
A heavy duty variant of the utility was marketed as the Dodge utility. (VG-E20)

Chrysler VIP

A long wheelbase variant of the VG Valiant was also offered as the Chrysler VIP (VG-P41).

Engines and transmissions
Four engines were offered.
  I6 "Slant 6"
  I6 "Hemi"
  I6 "Hemi"
  V8

The  "Hemi" was added to the lineup early in 1971, replacing the  "Slant 6".

Two transmissions were available.
 Three speed manual
 Three speed automatic

Production and replacement
A total 52,944 of VG series Valiants were built prior to the replacement of the VG by the Valiant VH in June 1971.

References

Cars of Australia
Valiant vehicles
Valiant
Cars introduced in 1970
1970s cars
Cars discontinued in 1971